Carl W. Mantz was a Republican member of the Pennsylvania House of Representatives, representing the 187th District in 2007 and 2008. He lives in Kutztown, Pennsylvania. He retired prior to the 2008 election and was succeeded by Republican Gary Day.

Prior to elective office, Mantz was president of the Kutztown Borough Council and a former Assistant District Attorney.

References

External links
Pennsylvania House of Representatives - Carl W. Mantz (official PA House website)
Pennsylvania House Republican Caucus - Representative Carl W. Mantz (official Party website)
Biography, voting record, and interest group ratings at Project Vote Smart

Living people
Republican Party members of the Pennsylvania House of Representatives
Year of birth missing (living people)